Briganti is an Italian surname, associated with the Italian word Brigantaggio. Notable people with the surname include:
 
Giuliano Briganti (1918–1922), Italian art historian
Marco Briganti (born 1982), Italian footballer
Vince Briganti (born 1942), Italo-Belgian footballer

See also
 Giovanni De Briganti (1892–1937), Italian aviator

Italian-language surnames